The 1 to 2 ton was a sailing event on the Sailing at the 1900 Summer Olympics program in Meulan. Nine boats started during the two races in the 1 to 2 ton. Twenty–two competitors from three countries are documented. The races were held on 22 and 25 May 1900 on the river Seine.

Race schedule

Course area and course configuration 
For the 1 to 2 ton the  course in the Meulan course area was used.

Weather conditions 
The race was troublesome due to an almost complete absence of any wind and that the wind there came perpendicular to the course (river Seine) and was blocked or diverted by trees and buildings.

Final results 
Two separate races were sailed. No combined results were made.

Race of 22 May 1900

Race of 25 May 1900 
This race saw with Aschenbrödel (German for Cinderella) one more boat competing. One day earlier they had entered in the ½—1 ton class, but were not permitted to race as their boat measured in at 1.041 tons. In this class the German crew sailed the lightest boat, yet easily finished in the quickest time. Their low handicap served only to widen the gap between them and the second-place Swiss team.

Notes 
Since Hélène de Pourtalès was the first female Olympic starter in the modern Olympics she holds the first Olympic medals won by a woman. However the Swiss team did not win the first medals for Switzerland, that honor goes to Louis Zutter during the 1896 Olympics.

Other information 
Initially only the race on 22 May 1900 was part of the Olympic program. However the race on the 25 May 1900, initially part of the Exposition Universelle program, was afterwards awarded with an Olympic status.

Further reading

References 

1 to 2 ton
Ton class